The 2018 AFA Senior Male League is the 19th season of the AFA Senior Male League, the only football league in Anguilla.

Kicks United won the league championship, winning every single one of their matches. It was the club's fifth Anguillan title, and their first since 2015.

Standings

Related Competitions

President's Cup

The pre-season President's Cup took place between 19 November and 17 December, and was won by Kicks United.

References

AFA Senior Male League seasons
2017–18 in Caribbean football leagues
2018–19 in Caribbean football leagues
2018 domestic association football leagues